The Land of Nod, now known as Crate&Kids, was a catalog, internet, and retail store company, based in Northbrook, Illinois, specializing in children's furniture, bedding, and accessories.

Scott Eirinberg and Jamie Cohen launched the company in 1996 out of Eirinberg's basement in the Chicago suburbs. In 2000, The Land of Nod formed an equity partnership with Crate & Barrel to help expand their presence in the United States market. In 2010, Eirinberg left the company and in February 2011, Cohen left the company.

The store, which has been owned by Crate and Barrel since 2001, was made available online starting April 4, 2018.

References

External links 

 Crate & Kids

Retail companies established in 1996
Furniture retailers of the United States